The 2006 edition of the Men's Under-23 Time Trial World Championships took place on September 20. The Championships were hosted by the Austrian city of Salzburg, and it featured 39.54 kilometres of racing against the clock.

Results
September 20, 2006: Salzburg, 39.54 km

References

External links
Results
Race website

Men's Under-23 Time Trial
UCI Road World Championships – Men's under-23 time trial